Krasnaya Ushna is a rural locality (a settlement) in Malyshevskoye Rural Settlement, Selivanovsky District, Vladimir Oblast, Russia. The population was 553 as of 2010. There are 9 streets.

Geography 
Krasnaya Ushna is located on the Ushna River, 17 km southwest of Krasnaya Gorbatka (the district's administrative centre) by road. Yartsevo is the nearest rural locality.

References 

Rural localities in Selivanovsky District